Syed Ameer Ali Order of the Star of India (1849–1928) was an Indian jurist, a prominent political leader, and author of a number of influential books on Muslim history and the modern development of Islam. He hailed from the state of Oudh from where his father moved and settled down in the Bengal Presidency and is credited for his contributions to the law of India, particularly Muslim personal law, as well as the development of political philosophy for Muslims, during the British Raj.

He was a signatory to the 1906 Petition to the Viceroy and was thus a founding-member of the All India Muslim League. He played a key role in securing separate electorates for the Muslims in British India and promoting the cause of the Khilafat Movement.

Family background
He was born on 6 April 1849, toward the end of Mughal empire in India, at Cuttack in Odisha as the fourth of five sons of Syed Saadat Ali (d. 1856) from Mohan in Unnao of Oudh State. The Shiite family traced its descent to prophet Muhammad through his daughter Fatima from Imam Ali al-Rida, his great-grandfather having moved to India from Khorasan during Nadir Shah's Indian campaign in 1739.

His father settled in Cuttack after Ameer Ali's grandfather (who worked in the service of Asaf-ud-Daulah - the Nawab of Awadh) died in 1820, there he married the daughter of Shamsuddin Khan, one of the nobles of Sambalpur. He would later move the family to Calcutta, and then to Chinsura where they settled more permanently. His family took advantage of the educational facilities provided by the British government but otherwise shunned by the Muslim community. He received his initial education at Hooghly Mohsin College and with the assistance of his British teachers and supported by several competitive scholarships, he achieved outstanding examination results, graduating from Calcutta University in 1867, and gaining an MA degree with Honours in history in 1868. The LLB degree followed quickly in 1869. He then began legal practice in Calcutta. By this time, he was already one of the few outstanding Muslim achievers of his generation.

Political career
After moving to London, where he stayed between 1869 and 1873, he joined the Inner Temple (professional associations for barristers and judges) and made contacts with some people of London. He absorbed the influence of contemporary liberalism. He had contacts with almost all the administrators concerned with India and with leading English liberals such as John Bright and the Fawcetts, Henry (1831–1898) and his wife, Millicent Fawcett (1847–1929.)

Syed Ameer Ali resumed his legal practice at Calcutta High Court on his return to India in 1873. The year after, he was elected as a Fellow of Calcutta University as well as being appointed as a lecturer in Islamic Law at the Presidency College, Kolkata. In 1878, he was appointed as the member of the Bengal Legislative Council. He revisited England in 1880 for one year.

He became a professor of law in Calcutta University in 1881. In 1883, he was nominated to the membership of the Governor General Council. In 1890 he was made a judge in the Calcutta High Court. Earlier he had founded the political organisation, Central National Muhammedan Association, in Calcutta in 1877. This association later spread nationwide with 34 branches from Madras to Karachi. This made him the first Muslim leader to put into practice the need for such an organisation due to the belief that efforts directed through an organisation would be more effective than those originating from an individual leader. The Association played an important role in the modernisation of Muslims and in arousing their political consciousness. He was associated with it for over 25 years, and worked for the political advancement of the Muslims. Syed Amir Ali became the second Indian to hold the post of law member of the government of India, assuming the position after Satyendra P. Sinha resigned in November 1910.

Syed Ameer Ali established the London Muslim League in 1908. This organisation was an independent body and not a branch of All India Muslim League. In 1909, he became the first Indian to sit as a member of the Judicial Committee of the Privy Council on which he would serve till his death in 1928. On appointment to the Privy Council he became entitled to be addressed as The Right Honourable.

In 1908, he was an advisory member to the Muhammadan Art and Life in Turkey, Persia, Egypt, Morocco and India exhibition held at the Whitechapel Gallery. The Autumn Exhibition was held from 23 October to 6 December. The opening day to the public was on 27th Ramadan.

In 1910, he formally co-established the London Mosque Fund, alongside a group of prominent British Muslims, to finance the building of the first mosque in the capital: East London Mosque, today one of the largest mosques in Europe. His field of activities was now broadened and he stood for Muslim welfare all over the world. He played an important role in securing separate electorates for the Muslims in India and promoting the cause of the Khilafat Movement.

He retired from Calcutta High Court in 1904 and decided to settle down, with his English wife (Isabelle Ida Konstam) in England where he was somewhat isolated from the main current of Muslim political life. Throughout his career, he was known as a jurist and a well-known Islamic scholar. He died on 4 August 1928 in Sussex (Rudgwick) and was buried in Brookwood Cemetery.

Personal beliefs
Syed Ameer Ali believed that the Muslims as a downtrodden nation could get more benefit from loyalty to the British rather than from any opposition to them. For this reason, he called upon his followers to devote their energy and attention to popularising English education among the Muslims. This perception and consequent activism have been known as the Aligarh Movement.

Referring to the concept of progressive social laws, Syed Ameer Ali wrote:

Opinions and legacy
David Samuel Margoliouth in the preface of his book Mohammed and the Rise of Islam wrote:

Syed Ameer Ali belongs to that generation of Indian Muslims who tried to defend their faith, Islam, at a time when Mughal empire had only recently collapsed in 1857 and the Muslims were generally out of favour with the British rulers. The prevailing environment was generally hostile to Islam and Muslims. That's why, to some people, he may appear somewhat apologetic in his narration of Muslim history. Like some other authors of that time, he tried to show that Islam was a rational religion. At that time, very little was being published about Islam that was positive. His works created a sense of hope for the Muslim youth and provided a much needed feeling of historical context in the colonized British India.

Honors and recognition
There is a very famous Hall in the University of Rajshahi the second largest university of Bangladesh which is named in his honour The "Sayed Ameer Ali Hall".
In recognition of his services, Pakistan Postal Service issued a commemorative postage stamp in 1990 to honor him in its 'Pioneers of Freedom' series.

See also
 The Nineteenth Century (periodical), for which Ameer Ali authored articles
Judicial Committee of the Privy Council
Shia Islam in India

Books
 A Critical Examination of the Life and Teachings of Mohammed (1873) — His first book, written when he was 24, while in England. The orientalist Major R. D. Osborn (1835–1889) wrote: "Regarded simply as a literary achievement, we have never read anything issuing from the educated classes in this country which could be compared with it; and the Muslims of India are to be congratulated on the possession of so able a man in their rank. It is impossible if his after-life accords with this early promise that he should not leave his influence for good stamped upon the country in deep and enduring characters."
 The Personal Law of Muhammedans (1880)
 The Spirit of Islam (editions in 1891, 1922, 1953) -  A book covering the life of Muhammad, and the political, cultural, literary, scientific, mystic, philosophical, and social history of Islam.
 Ethics of Islam (1893)
 A Short History of Saracens (1899)
 Islam (1906)
 The Legal Position of Women in Islam (1912)

References

External links

 Ameer Ali, Syad in the Dictionary of Indian Biography
 Ameer, Ali (Hon. Syed) in Men-at-the-Bar by Joseph Foster
 Ali, Syed Ameer, 1849-1928 at Online Books Page
 

1849 births
1928 deaths
Bengali Muslims
Bengali lawyers
19th-century Bengalis
19th-century Indian judges
20th-century Indian judges
Aliah University alumni
All India Muslim League members
Burials at Brookwood Cemetery
Companions of the Order of the Indian Empire
Indian members of the Privy Council of the United Kingdom
Judges of the Calcutta High Court
Leaders of the Pakistan Movement
Members of the Judicial Committee of the Privy Council
Academic staff of Presidency University, Kolkata
Shia scholars of Islam
University of Calcutta alumni
Academic staff of the University of Calcutta
West Bengal politicians
People from Cuttack